Jack J. Stephans (March 1, 1939 – September 29, 2020) was an American football coach. He served as the head football coach at Jersey City State College—now known as New Jersey City University—from 1966 to 1973, at William Paterson University in Wayne, New Jersey from 1975 to 1977, and at Fordham University from  1979 to 1980.

Born in Hoboken, Stephans was raised in nearby West New York and played prep football at Memorial High School in his hometown, graduating in 1957.

Stephans died on September 29, 2020 from complications of amyotrophic lateral sclerosis (ALS).

Head coaching record

References

1939 births
2020 deaths
American football centers
Boston University Terriers football players
Fordham Rams football coaches
Holy Cross Crusaders football players
Montclair State Red Hawks football coaches
New Jersey City Gothic Knights football coaches
Memorial High School (West New York, New Jersey) alumni
William Paterson Pioneers football coaches
High school football coaches in New Jersey
University of South Carolina alumni
Sportspeople from Hoboken, New Jersey
People from West New York, New Jersey
Coaches of American football from New Jersey
Players of American football from New Jersey
Neurological disease deaths in New Jersey
Deaths from motor neuron disease